Arthur Henderson Smith (July18, 1845August31, 1932) (Chinese name: 明恩溥; pinyin: Ming Enpu) was a missionary of the American Board of Commissioners for Foreign Missions noted for spending 54 years as a missionary in China and writing books which presented China to foreign readers. These books include Chinese Characteristics, Village Life in China  and The Uplift of China. In the 1920s, Chinese Characteristics was still the most widely read book on China among foreign residents there.

Biography
He was born in Vernon, Connecticut, to a middle-class Protestant family described by historian Lydia H. Liu as "rich on either side with clergy and local respectability." He served as a Wisconsin Infantry soldier in the Civil War before graduating from Beloit College in 1867, then briefly attended Andover Theological Seminary before taking a degree in 1871 from Union Theological Seminary. After marrying Emma Jane Dickinson, he was ordained into the Congregational ministry. The couple sailed for China in 1872. After two years of language study in Tianjin, they established themselves at Pangzhuang, a village in Shandong, where they stayed until the Boxer Uprising.

In 1907 Smith was elected the American co-chair of the China Centenary Missionary Conference in Shanghai, a conference attended by more than 1,000 Protestant missionaries.  He retired in 1926, 54 years after his arrival in China.  His wife died the same year. He died in California in 1932 at the age of 87.

The Boxer Uprising
In 1898 and 1899 an indigenous anti-foreign movement arose in Shandong province. One of the missionaries there, possibly Smith, named the participants, mostly farmers, the “Boxers” because of their athletic rituals. The Boxer movement rapidly spread to several provinces in northern China and, eventually, received the support of the Chinese government. Smith and his wife were attending a missionary conference in Tongzhou in May 1900 when all the missionaries in Northern China found it necessary to seek safety from the Boxers by fleeing to Beijing or Tianjin. The missionary William Scott Ament rescued Smith,  22 other American missionaries and about 100 Chinese Christians in Tongzhou and escorted them to Peking. They took refuge in the Legation Quarter during the siege of the legations from June20 to August14, 1900.

Smith’s role in the siege was a minor one as a gate guard, but he gathered material for his book, China in Convulsion, which is the most detailed account of the Boxer Rebellion.  In 1906, Smith helped to persuade President Theodore Roosevelt to devote the indemnity payments China was making to the United States to the education of Chinese students. More than $12 million was spent on this Boxer Indemnity Scholarship Program.

Influence and legacy
Smith's acerbic style and pithy judgments excited interest in both Chinese and Westerners. Chinese Characteristics was translated into Japanese, and from that translation into Chinese. One study found that among English readers the book was the most widely read book on China until it was replaced by Pearl Buck's The Good Earth (1931).  Gu Hongming, who idealized Imperial China, harshly criticised Smith, but the pioneer of China's new literary language Lu Xun wrote that he was influenced by Chinese Characteristics.

Smith drew a range of comment from later Western historians and critics. Harold R. Isaacs, in his influential Scratches on Our Minds (1958), said Smith wrote with a "suggestion of exhausted patience" as he undertook to write in the "scholarly manner", complete with "prefatory warnings against generalizations and a text dotted with sweeping statements." Isaacs quoted extensively from Smith and singled out examples of his dismissive characterization of Chinese society. He wrote that Smith also deplored the widespread use in the United States of the phrase "John Chinaman" applied to all Chinese because it spread the idea that all Chinese were alike and had no individual identities  Timothy Cheek for instance, wrote that Smith’s work exemplified the ‘thinly disguised racism’ contained in the writings of many Protestant missionaries in China at that time.

Smith is also remembered for speaking out against the Chinese practice of infanticide of girls and drawing attention to this often-ignored practice.

Selected works 
 Chinese Characteristics (New York: Revell, 1894). Various reprints: EastBridge, D'Asia Vue, with a Preface by Lydia Liu, 2003. . Online at Internet Archive here
 Village Life in China; a Study in Sociology. New York, Chicago [etc.]: F. H. Revell Company, 1899. Various reprints.
 China in Convulsion. New York,: F. H. Revell Co., 1901. Volume 1 Volume 2
 Proverbs and Common Sayings from the Chinese: Together with Much Related and Unrelated Matter, Interspersed with Observations on Chinese Things-in-general (1902)
 Rex Christus: an outline study of China (1904)
 The Uplift of China (1907)
 China and America To-day: A Study of Conditions and Relations, Volume 1 (1907)
 Proverbs and Common Sayings from the Chinese, Together with Much Related and Unrelated Matter, Interspersed with Observations on Chinese Things in General. New York, 1914. Reprint, Paragon 1965.

See also

Notes

References
 Myron Cohen, "Introduction," Village Life in China (Boston: Little, Brown, 1970).
 . Internet Archive Online Here
  Internet Archive online here.
 Lydia Liu,”Translating National Character: Lu Xun and Arthur Smith,” Ch 2, Translingual Practice: Literature, National Culture, and Translated Modernity: China 1900-1937 (Stanford 1995). Shows how Chinese nationalists made use of Smith's Chinese Characteristics, which had been quickly translated into Japanese, thence into Chinese.
 
 Theodore D. Pappas, “Arthur Henderson Smith and the American Mission in China,” Wisconsin Magazine of History 70.3 (Spring 1987): 163-186. JSTOR https://www.jstor.org/stable/4636056 
 Larry Clinton Thompson, William Scott Ament and the Boxer Rebellion: Heroism, Hubris, and the Ideal Missionary. Jefferson, NC: McFarland, 2009

External links

   Guide to the Arthur Henderson Smith Papers Beloit College Archives.

 
 
 WorldCat Arthur H. Smith Authority Page.
 Arthur Henderson Smith  Biographical Dictionary of Chinese Christianity

1845 births
1932 deaths
Union Army soldiers
Protestant missionaries in China
American Protestant missionaries
American expatriates in China
People of Connecticut in the American Civil War
Beloit College alumni